Gezhi School may refer to:

Fuzhou Gezhi High School
Shanghai Gezhi High School